Phases is the third remix album by electronicore band I See Stars, released through Sumerian Records on August 28, 2015. The album features "raw and unplugged" versions of some of the band's previously recorded material, as well as some cover songs. The album is entirely composed of acoustic guitars and basses, pianos, and stringed instruments accompanied by Devin and Andrew Oliver's singing, in place of the screaming, breakdowns, and electronics typically used by the band.

On September 25, 2015, the band embarked on the Phases tour in promotion of the album. Appropriately, the tour only featured the versions of songs performed on Phases and did not feature the entire band, leading to departure rumors of keyboardist and unclean vocalist Zach Johnson and guitarist Jimmy Gregerson. Gregerson's departure was later confirmed, followed by Johnson's a short while later.

Track listing
All tracks except for 3, 6, 8, and 10 written by I See Stars; lyrics written by Andrew and Devin Oliver.

Chart performance

Personnel
Credits were adapted from AllMusic.
I See Stars
Brent Allen – guitars
Andrew Oliver – drums, percussion, backing vocals
Devin Oliver – lead vocals
Jeff Valentine – bass guitar

Additional personnel
Nick Scott – producing, co-writing, mixing, mastering, additional guitar
Jake Burkey – additional percussion
Christopher Coo – piano, keyboards
Jacob Halmich – cello

References

I See Stars albums
Sumerian Records albums
2015 albums